Kishore Deerpalsing (1947–2018) was a Mauritian politician, academic and former minister.

Early life, education & career
Kishore Deerpalsing worked as Senior Lacturer at The University of Mauritius after completing his university studies.

Political career
Kishore Deepalsing's political career started in Harish Boodhoo's party PSM in 1979. He was elected to parliament in 1982 in Constituency N°14 (Savanne-Rivière-Noire) as PSM-MMM candidate and served as Minister of Agriculture under Anerood Jugnauth until 1985, having been re-elected in 1983 as MSM candidate. The Amsterdam Boys Scandal was the trigger for Deerpalsing's resignation in 1985 when 4 members of Parliament and members of the MSM party were arrested with hard drugs at the international Amsterdam Airport Schiphol.

At the 1991 elections he was defeated at Constituency N°13 (Rivière des Anguilles/ Souillac). In 1995 he was elected to Parliament at Constituency N°13, eventually becoming Minister of Health in 1998 before resigning in 2000 due to the Mediclinic Scandal. Deerpalsing was the subject of allegations of corruption regarding the procurement of medical equipment for clinics at De Belvedère and L’Escalier. The investigation by the Economic Crime Office (ECO) eventually cleared Deerpalsing of any wrong-doing.

References

1947 births
2018 deaths
Government ministers of Mauritius
Members of the National Assembly (Mauritius)
Militant Socialist Movement politicians
Parti Socialiste Mauricien politicians
Mauritian Hindus
Mauritian politicians of Indian descent